The Lévesque River is a tributary on the south shore of Lake Saint-Pierre which is crossed to the northeast by the St. Lawrence River. The Lévesque river crosses the municipalities of Saint-Elphège, Pierreville and Baie-du-Febvre, in the Nicolet-Yamaska Regional County Municipality (MRC), in the administrative region of Centre-du-Québec, in Quebec, in Canada.

Geography 

The main neighboring hydrographic slopes of the Lévesque River are:
 north side: Lake Saint-Pierre, St. Lawrence River;
 east side: Colbert River, Nicolet River, Nicolet South-West River;
 south side: Saint-François River;
 west side: Saint-François River.

The Lévesque river draws its source from agricultural and forest streams, such as the Fortunat-Veilleux stream and the Bourassa discharge, which drain an area located near the northeast shore of the Saint-François River.

The course of the Lévesque River runs north-west parallel (on the east side) to the Saint-François River and parallel (on the west side) to the Colbert River. The Lévesque River flows through agricultural areas in Saint-Elphège, Pierreville and Baie-du-Febvre, crossing route 226, rang Sainte-Anne road, route 132 and rang du Petit-Bois road.

The Lévesque River flows on the south shore of lac Saint-Pierre, to the west of the small bay designated "Le Fer à Cheval" (staging area for birds) and to the west of the village of Baie-du-Febvre.

Toponymy 
The term "Lévesque" constitutes a family name of French origin.

The toponym "Rivière Lévesque" was formalized on December 5, 1968, at the Commission de toponymie du Québec.

See also 
 List of rivers of Quebec

References 

Rivers of Centre-du-Québec
Nicolet-Yamaska Regional County Municipality